A heliograph is a solar telegraph system that signals by flashes of sunlight (generally using Morse code) reflected by a mirror. The flashes are produced by momentarily pivoting the mirror, or by interrupting the beam with a shutter. The heliograph was a simple but effective instrument for instantaneous optical communication over long distances during the late 19th and early 20th century. Its main uses were military, survey and forest protection work. Heliographs were standard issue in the British and Australian armies until the 1960s, and were used by the Pakistani army as late as 1975.

Description

There were many heliograph types.  Most heliographs were variants of the British Army Mance Mark V version (Fig.1). It used a mirror with a small unsilvered spot in the centre. The sender aligned the heliograph to the target by looking at the reflected target in the mirror and moving their head until the target was hidden by the unsilvered spot. Keeping their head still, they then adjusted the aiming rod so its cross wires bisected the target. They then turned up the sighting vane, which covered the cross wires with a diagram of a cross, and aligned the mirror with the tangent and elevation screws so the small shadow that was the reflection of the unsilvered spot hole was on the cross target.  This indicated that the sunbeam was pointing at the target. 
The flashes were produced by a keying mechanism that tilted the mirror up a few degrees at the push of a lever at the back of the instrument. If the sun was in front of the sender, its rays were reflected directly from this mirror to the receiving station.  If the sun was behind the sender, the sighting rod was replaced by a second mirror, to capture the sunlight from the main mirror and reflect it to the receiving station. The U. S. Signal Corps heliograph mirror did not tilt. This type produced flashes by a shutter mounted on a second tripod (Fig 4).

The heliograph had certain advantages. It allowed long distance communication without a fixed infrastructure, though it could also be linked to make a fixed network extending for hundreds of miles, as in the fort-to-fort network used for the Geronimo campaign. It was very portable, did not require any power source, and was relatively secure since it was invisible to those not near the axis of operation, and the beam was very narrow, spreading only 50 feet per mile of range. However, anyone in the beam with the correct knowledge could intercept signals without being detected. In the Boer War, where both sides used heliographs, tubes were sometimes used to decrease the dispersion of the beam. In some other circumstances, though, a narrow beam made it difficult to stay aligned with a moving target, as when communicating from shore to a moving ship, so the British issued a dispersing lens to broaden the heliograph beam from its natural diameter of 0.5 degrees to 15 degrees.

The range of a heliograph depends on the opacity of the air and the effective collecting area of the mirrors. Heliograph mirrors ranged from 1.5 inches to 12 inches or more. Stations at higher altitudes benefit from thinner, clearer air, and are required in any event for great ranges, to clear the curvature of the earth. A good approximation for ranges of 20–50 miles is that the flash of a circular mirror is visible to the naked eye for 10 miles for each inch of mirror diameter, and farther with a telescope.

History

The German professor Carl Friedrich Gauss of the University of Göttingen developed and used a predecessor of the heliograph (the heliotrope) in 1821. His device directed a controlled beam of sunlight to a distant station to be used as a marker for geodetic survey work, and was suggested as a means of telegraphic communications. This is the first reliably documented heliographic device, despite much speculation about possible ancient incidents of sun-flash signalling, and the documented  existence of other forms of ancient optical telegraphy.

For example, one author in 1919 chose to "hazard the theory" that the mainland signals Roman emperor Tiberius watched for from Capri  were mirror flashes, but admitted "there are no references in ancient writings to the use of signaling by mirrors", and that the documented means of ancient long-range visual telecommunications was by beacon fires and beacon smoke, not mirrors.

Similarly, the story that a shield was used as a heliograph at the Battle of Marathon is a modern myth, originating in the 1800s. Herodotus never mentioned any flash. What Herodotus did write was that someone was accused of having arranged to "hold up a shield as a signal". Suspicion grew in the 1900s that the flash theory was implausible. The conclusion after testing the theory was "Nobody flashed a shield at the Battle of Marathon".

In a letter dated 3 June 1778, John Norris, High Sheriff of Buckinghamshire, England, notes: "Did this day heliograph intelligence from Dr [Benjamin] Franklin in Paris to Wycombe". However, there is little evidence that "heliograph" here is other than a misspelling of "holograph". The term "heliograph" for solar telegraphy did not enter the English language until the 1870s—even the word "telegraphy" was not coined until the 1790s.

Henry Christopher Mance (1840–1926), of the British Government Persian Gulf Telegraph Department, developed the first widely accepted heliograph about 1869  while stationed at Karachi, in the Bombay Presidency in British India. Mance was familiar with heliotropes by their use for the Great Trigonometrical Survey of India. The Mance Heliograph was operated easily by one man, and since it weighed about seven pounds, the operator could readily carry the device and its tripod. The British Army tested the heliograph in India at a range of 35 miles with favorable results. During the Jowaki Afridi expedition sent by the British-Indian government in 1877, the heliograph was first tested in war.

The simple and effective instrument that Mance invented was to be an important part of military communications for more than 60 years. The usefulness of heliographs was limited to daytimes with strong sunlight, but they were the most powerful type of visual signalling device known. In pre-radio times heliography was often the only means of communication that could span ranges of as much as 100 miles with a lightweight portable instrument.

In the United States military, by mid-1878, Colonel Nelson A. Miles had established a line of heliographs connecting Fort Keogh and Fort Custer, Montana, a distance of 140 miles. In 1886, General Nelson A. Miles set up a network of 27 heliograph stations in Arizona and New Mexico during the hunt for Geronimo. In 1890, Major W. J. Volkmar of the US Army demonstrated in Arizona and New Mexico the possibility of performing communication by heliograph over a heliograph network aggregating 2,000 miles in length. The network of communication begun by General Miles in 1886, and continued by Lieutenant W. A. Glassford, was perfected in 1889 at ranges of 85, 88, 95, and 125 miles over a rugged and broken country, which was the stronghold of the Apache and other hostile Indian tribes.

By 1887, heliographs in use included not only the British Mance and Begbie heliographs, but also the American Grugan, Garner and Pursell heliographs.  The Grugan and Pursell heliographs used shutters, and the others used movable mirrors operated by a finger key. The Mance, Grugan and Pursell heliographs used two tripods, and the others one. The signals could either be momentary flashes, or momentary obscurations. In 1888, the US Signal Service reviewed all of these devices, as well as the Finley Helio-Telegraph, and finding none completely suitable, developed the US Signal Service heliograph, a two-tripod, shutter-based machine of 13 7/8 lb. total weight, and ordered 100 for a total cost of $4,205. In 1893, the number of heliographs manufactured for the US Signal Service was 133.

The heyday of the heliograph was probably the Second Boer War in South Africa, where it was much used by both the British and the Boers.  The terrain and climate, as well as the nature of the campaign, made heliography a logical choice. For night communications, the British used some large Aldis lamps, brought inland on railroad cars, and equipped with leaf-type shutters for keying a beam of light into dots and dashes. During the early stages of the war, the British garrisons were besieged in Kimberley, Ladysmith, and Mafeking. With land telegraph lines cut, the only contact with the outside world was via light-beam communication, helio by day, and Aldis lamps at night.

In 1909, the use of heliography for forestry protection was introduced in the United States. By 1920 such use was widespread in the US and beginning in Canada, and the heliograph was regarded as "next to the telephone, the most useful communication device that is at present available for forest-protection services". D.P. Godwin of the US Forestry Service invented a very portable (4.5 lb) heliograph of the single-tripod, shutter plus mirror type for forestry use.

Immediately prior to the outbreak of World War I,  the cavalry regiments of the Russian Imperial Army were still being trained in heliograph communications to augment the efficiency of their scouting and reporting roles. The Red Army during the Russian Civil War made use of a series of heliograph stations to disseminate intelligence efficiently about basmachi rebel movements in Turkestan in 1926.

During World War II, South African and Australian forces used the heliograph while fighting German forces in Libya and Egypt in 1941 and 1942.

The heliograph remained standard equipment for military signallers in the Australian and British armies until the 1940s, where it was considered a "low probability of intercept" type of communication. The Canadian Army was the last major army to have the heliograph as an issue item. By the time the mirror instruments were retired, they were seldom used for signalling. However, as recently as the 1980s, heliographs were used by Afghan forces during the Soviet invasion of Afghanistan.  Signal mirrors are still included in survival kits for emergency signaling to search and rescue aircraft.

Automated heliographs

Most heliographs of the 19th and 20th century were completely manual. The steps of aligning the heliograph on the target, co-aligning the reflected sunbeam with the heliograph, maintaining the sunbeam alignment as the sun moved, transcribing the message into flashes, modulating the sunbeam into those flashes, detecting the flashes at the receiving end, and transcribing the flashes into the message, were all done manually. One notable exception – many French heliographs used clockwork heliostats to automatically steer out the sun's motion. By 1884, all active units of the "Mangin apparatus" (a dual-mode French military field optical telegraph that could use either lantern or sunlight) were equipped with clockwork heliostats. The Mangin apparatus with heliostat was still in service in 1917. Proposals to automate both the modulation of the sunbeam (by clockwork) and the detection (by electrical selenium photodetectors, or photographic means) date back to at least 1882. In 1961, the US Air Force was working on a space heliograph to signal between satellites

In May 2012, "Solar Beacon" robotic mirrors designed at UC Berkeley were mounted on the towers of the Golden Gate bridge, and a web site set up where the public could schedule times for the mirrors to signal with sun-flashes, entering the time and their latitude, longitude and altitude. The solar beacons were later moved to Sather Tower at UC Berkeley. By June 2012, the public could specify a "custom show" of up to 32 "on" or "off" periods of 4 seconds each, permitting the transmission of a few characters of Morse Code. The designer described the Solar Beacon as a "heliostat", not a "heliograph".

The first digitally controlled heliograph was designed and built in 2015.   It was a semi-finalist in the Broadcom MASTERS competition.

See also
 Heliography, an early photographic process invented by Joseph Nicéphore Niépce around 1822
 Heliotrope (instrument)
 Operation On-Target, a Scouting program 
 Signal lamp

References

Further reading
 Lewis Coe, Great Days of the Heliograph, Crown Point, 1987

External links

Heliography: Communicating with Mirrors Photographs of British, American and Portuguese heliographs.
The Heliograph A description of the British Mance, Begbie and French LeSeurre heliographs with illustrations (1899)
Eliografo Detailed color photographs of a World War 2 British Mance heliograph (Italian).
"Heliograph" at the National Library of Australia: Trove; 100+ historical heliograph photographs at the Australian War Memorial and elsewhere
Royal Signals Datasheet No. 2. The Heliograph (revised April 2003)
CHAPTER IV THE HELIOGRAPH (PAGE 48 OF THE 1905 SIGNALLING HANDBOOK)
Mance Mark V Heliograph Detailed photos of a British Mark V Heliograph and kit, links to patents. Clicking on visible photos reveals high resolution photos.
The Heliograph in the Apache Wars
Signals communication in the South African War 1899-1902
Heliographs at the Museum of RetroTechnology

History of telecommunications
Telegraphy
Optical communications